Tenerife Tram is a light rail or tram service located on the island of Tenerife, one of the Canary Islands in Spain. It is operated by Metropolitano de Tenerife, a limited company now 100% owned by Cabildo de Tenerife. Service started on 2 June 2007 over a  route that linked the Intercambiador in Santa Cruz de Tenerife with Avenida de la Trinidad in La Laguna. A second line between La Cuesta and Tíncer opened in 2009 (connecting with Line 1 at Hospital Universitario and El Cardonal). It is the only existing tramway or train in the Canary Islands.

History

A streetcar (tram) system had once existed on Tenerife.  It was inaugurated on 7 April 1901, with a service that began in Santa Cruz and finished in La Laguna. It was designed by the Spanish engineer and military man Julio Cervera Baviera. In 1904 the line was extended to Tacoronte. In 1927 the Cabildo of Tenerife took control of the operating company due to economic problems. The tram car lines remained functional until 1951, when, due to a series of problems and accidents, and increased competition with the car and bus (on Tenerife, buses are called guaguas), the service was discontinued.

Construction
After much political debate on investment in trams versus buses, approval was eventually given to the €306 million budget.

Construction started in 2004, and by December 2005 sufficient track existed for train supplier Alstom to start test-running on a  section of track between the systems train depot and the Hospital Universitario de Canarias in La Cuesta. The last of the 20 tram units were handed over in August 2006.

The construction phase officially ended on 2 June 2007 with the opening day tram on Line 1. Free service was provided to all passengers from that weekend all the way through to the following Sunday, before tariffs and tickets were introduced.

Rolling stock

The light rail (tram) rolling stock is entirely made up of the Citadis 302 model, 100% low floor from Alstom, as already used on the Madrid Light Metro, the Casablanca Tramway, the Parla Tram, and lines Trambaix and Trambesòs of the Barcelona Metro. The trams are each made up of five carriages, two driving carriages sandwiching three passenger/power carriages.

Operations

Line 1

In January 2011 the Padre Anchieta stop was moved from its initial location in the Trinity Avenue, to its current location next to the La Laguna bus interchange at a cost of €900,000.

Plans are in place to lengthen the line with four additional stops, including Tenerife North Airport. There would also be new stations in San Antonio, San Lazaro (Park and Ride) and Los Rodeos-TFN.

Line 2

Line 2 opened on 30 May 2009, running from La Cuesta to Tíncer, sharing stops at University Hospital and El Cardonal with Line 1. It is planned to extend the line by 2.5 km from Tincer to La Gallega (district of the District southwest of Santa Cruz) to give coverage to the greater population.

Line 3 
A third line is expected to be built, proposed to run along the coast of the capital of Tenerife, and not as speculated through the center of the city of Santa Cruz.

Tariffs

In agreement between Cabildo de Tenerife, TITSA and MTSA, tram and bus systems are a fully integrated transport system, with journeys costing exactly the same, whichever system is chosen.

Network Map

See also
Tren de Gran Canaria
Rail transport in Spain

References

External links

 Tranvía de Tenerife 
 Tranvía de Tenerife 
 Tenerife Tram construction report
 Android App for Tenerife Tram

Transport in Tenerife
Tram transport in Spain